Colin Dunlop (15 September 1775 – 27 July 1837) was a Scottish politician and industrialist.

Originating from Dunlop, Dunlop qualified as an advocate, but soon left this to set up the Clyde Iron Works.  There, he patented the Hot Air Blast technique.

Dunlop was the president of the Glasgow Anti-Corn Law Association.  He stood in Glasgow in the 1835 UK general election as a Whig, winning a seat, but resigned in February 1836 by taking the Chiltern Hundreds.  He died the following year.

References

1775 births
1837 deaths
People from East Ayrshire
Scottish industrialists
UK MPs 1835–1837
Whig (British political party) MPs for Scottish constituencies